The 50th Brigade was an infantry brigade formation of the British Army. It was formed during the First World War as part of the New Army, also known as Kitchener's Army. It was assigned to the 17th (Northern) Division and served on the Western Front.

Formation
The infantry battalions did not all serve at once, but all were assigned to the brigade during the war.

10th (Service) Battalion, West Yorkshire Regiment
7th (Service) Battalion, East Yorkshire Regiment
7th (Service) Battalion, Green Howards
7th (Service) Battalion, York and Lancaster Regiment
6th (Service) Battalion, Dorset Regiment
50th Machine Gun Company, Machine Gun Corps
50th Trench Mortar Battery

References

Infantry brigades of the British Army in World War I